The 1998 Azusa Pacific Cougars football team was an American football team that represented Azusa Pacific University as an independent during the 1998 NAIA football season. In their fourth and final season under head coach Vic Shealy, the Cougars compiled a 12–2 record and won the NAIA national championship.

The team opened the season losing two of its first four-game before winning its final ten games. In their October 17 game against , the Cougars established a new school record with 634 yards of total offense. Senior quarterback Geoff Buffum passed for a school-record 416 yards and five touchdowns. Senior receiver also set a new school record with 238 receiving yards.

The Cougars qualified for the NAIA playoffs for the first time in the 34-year history of the Azusa Pacific football program. They defeated  in the semifinal game by a 26–24 score.

In the NAIA National Championship Game, played at Jim Carroll Stadium in Savannah, Tennessee, they faced . Azusa Pacific trailed, 14–7, at the end of the third quarter, but scored 10 points in the fourth quarter on a safety, a touchdown run by Jack Williams, and a two-point conversion, to win by a 17–14 score.

The team was led on offense by senior quarterback Geoff Buffum, senior receiver Dexter Davis and junior running back and cornerback Jack Williams, a transfer from BYU.  Williams was named Most Outstanding Offensive Player of the NAIA Championship Game and finished the season with 1,642 rushing yards.

The team played its home games at Cougar Athletic Stadium in Azusa, California.

In January 1999, Shealy resigned as head coach at Azusa Pacific to become the defense backs coach for Air Force.

Schedule

References

Azusa Pacific
Azusa Pacific Cougars football seasons
NAIA Football National Champions
Azusa Pacific Cougars football